Adnan Hasković (born 23 December 1984) is a Bosnian actor.

Biography
Adnan Hasković studied acting in Academy of Performing Arts in Sarajevo from 2003. He studied under professor Izudin Bajrović and then under professor Admir Glamočak. His professional debut was shown in Narodno Pozorište Sarajevo (Public Theater Sarajevo) with theater performance in Legenda o Ali-paši, and then Tvrđava, Prvi put s ocem na izbore, Jedan čovjek i jedna žena, ženidba, Balada o Omeru i Merimi.

Adnan also acted in numerous Bosnian films including: Fedex, Prva plata, Miješano meso za četiri osobe, Teško je biti fin.

First acting participation with SARTR (Sarajevo War Theater) in the play Ana Karenina (he played Ložač), and from  1 July 2008 he became an employed member of acting ensemble of SARTR.

His latest film, Venuto al mondo (2012), stars Penélope Cruz and was filmed in his home country of Bosnia and Herzegovina.

Filmography

References

External links

1984 births
Living people
Male actors from Sarajevo
Bosniaks of Bosnia and Herzegovina
Bosnia and Herzegovina male television actors
Bosnia and Herzegovina male film actors
21st-century Bosnia and Herzegovina male actors
Bosnia and Herzegovina male stage actors
Bosnia and Herzegovina male voice actors